Psilocybin mushrooms are mushrooms which contain the hallucinogenic substances psilocybin, psilocin, baeocystin and norbaeocystin. The mushrooms are collected and grown as an entheogen and recreational drug, despite being illegal in many countries. Many psilocybin mushrooms are in the genus Psilocybe, but species across several other genera contain the drugs.

General
Conocybe
Galerina
Gymnopilus
Inocybe
Panaeolus
Pholiotina
Pluteus
Psilocybe

Conocybe
Conocybe siligineoides R. Heim
Conocybe velutipes (Velen.) Hauskn. & Svrcek

Galerina
Galerina steglichii Besl<ref>{{cite journal |author=Gartz J. |year=1995 |url=http://leda.lycaeum.org/?ID=10423 |title=Cultivation and analysis of Psilocybe species andsteglichi |journal=Annali Museo Civico di Rovereto |volume=10 |pages=297–306 |access-date=28 September 2007 |archive-url=https://web.archive.org/web/20130726074127/http://leda.lycaeum.org/?ID=10423 |archive-date=26 July 2013 |url-status=dead }}</ref>

GymnopilusGymnopilus aeruginosus (Peck) Singer (photo)Gymnopilus braendlei (Peck) HeslerGymnopilus cyanopalmicola Guzm.-DávGymnopilus dilepis (Berk. & Broome) Singer Gymnopilus dunensis H. Bashir, Jabeen & Khalid Gymnopilus intermedius (Singer) SingerGymnopilus lateritius (Pat.) MurrillGymnopilus luteofolius (Peck) Singer (photo)Gymnopilus luteoviridis Thiers (photo)Gymnopilus luteus (Peck) Hesler (photo)Gymnopilus palmicola MurrillGymnopilus purpuratus (Cooke & Massee) Singer (photo)Gymnopilus subpurpuratus Guzmán-Davalos & GuzmánGymnopilus subspectabilis HeslerGymnopilus validipes (Peck) HeslerGymnopilus viridans Murrill

InocybeInocybe aeruginascens BabosInocybe caerulata Matheny, Bougher & G.M. GatesInocybe coelestium KuyperInocybe corydalinaInocybe corydalina var. corydalina Quél.Inocybe corydalina var. erinaceomorpha (Stangl & J. Veselsky) KuyperInocybe haemacta (Berk. & Cooke) Sacc.Inocybe tricolor Kühner

Most species in this genus are poisonous.

PanaeolusPanaeolus affinis (E. Horak) Ew. GerhardtPanaeolus africanus Ola'hPanaeolus axfordii Y. Hu, S.C. Karunarathna, P.E. Mortimer & J.C. Xu Panaeolus bisporus (Malencon and Bertault) Singer and WeeksPanaeolus cambodginiensis (OlaĽh et Heim) Singer & Weeks. (Merlin & Allen, 1993)
Panaeolus chlorocystis (Singer & R.A. Weeks) Ew. Gerhardt
Panaeolus cinctulus (Bolton) Britzelm.
Panaeolus cyanescens (Berk. & Broome) Sacc.
Panaeolus fimicola (Fr.) Gillet
Panaeolus lentisporus Ew. Gerhardt
Panaeolus microsporus Ola'h & Cailleux
Panaeolus moellerianus Singer
Panaeolus olivaceus F.H. Møller
Panaeolus rubricaulis Petch (= Panaeolus campanuloides Guzmán & K. Yokoy.)
Panaeolus tirunelveliensis (Natarajan & Raman) Ew. Gerhardt
Panaeolus tropicalis Ola'h
Panaeolus venezolanus Guzmán (= Panaeolus annulatus Natarajan & Raman)

Pholiotina
Pholiotina cyanopus Stamets
Pholiotina smithii (Watling) Enderle (Galera cyanopes Kauffman, Conocybe smithii Watling)

Pluteus

Pluteus albostipitatus (Dennis) Singer
Pluteus americanus (P. Banerjee & Sundb.) Justo, E.F. Malysheva & Minnis (2014)
Pluteus cyanopus Quél.
Pluteus glaucus Singer
Pluteus glaucotinctus E. Horak
Pluteus nigroviridis Babos
Pluteus phaeocyanopus Minnis & Sundb.
Pluteus salicinus (Pers. : Fr.) P. Kumm.
Pluteus saupei Justo & Minnis
Pluteus velutinornatus G. Stev. 1962.
Pluteus villosus (Bull.) Quél.

Psilocybe
A B C D E F G H I J K L M N O P Q R S T U V W X Y Z

A

Psilocybe acutipilea (Speg.) Guzmán
Psilocybe allenii Borov., Rockefeller & P.G.Werner
Psilocybe alutacea Y.S. Chang & A.K. Mills
Psilocybe angulospora Yen W. Wang & S.S. Tzean
Psilocybe antioquiensis Guzmán, Saldarriaga, Pineda, García & Velázquez
Psilocybe araucariicola P. S. Silva & Ram.-Cruz
Psilocybe atlantis Guzmán, Hanlin & C. White
Psilocybe aquamarina (Pegler) Guzmán
Psilocybe armandii Guzmán & S.H. Pollock
Psilocybe aucklandiae Guzmán, C.C. King & Bandala
Psilocybe aztecorum
Psilocybe aztecorum var. aztecorum
Psilocybe aztecorum var. bonetii (Guzmán) Guzmán
Psilocybe azurescens Stamets & Gartz

B 
Psilocybe baeocystis Singer & A.H. Sm. emend. Guzmán
Psilocybe banderillensis Guzmán
Psilocybe brasiliensis Guzmán
Psilocybe brunneocystidiata Guzmán & Horak

C

Psilocybe caeruleoannulata Singer ex Guzmán
Psilocybe caerulescens
Psilocybe caerulescens var. caerulescens Murrill
Psilocybe caerulescens var. ombrophila (R. Heim) Guzmán
Psilocybe caerulipes (Peck) Sacc.
Psilocybe callosa
Psilocybe carbonaria Singer
Psilocybe chuxiongensis T.Ma & K.D.Hyde
Psilocybe collybioides Singer & A.H. Sm.
Psilocybe columbiana Guzmán
Psilocybe congolensis Guzmán, S.C. Nixon & Cortés-Pérez 
Psilocybe cordispora R. Heim
Psilocybe cubensis (Earle) Singer
Psilocybe cyanescens Wakef. (non-sensu Krieglsteiner)
Psilocybe cyanofibrillosa Guzmán & Stamets

D
Psilocybe dumontii Singer ex Guzmán

E
Psilocybe egonii Guzmán & T.J. Baroni
Psilocybe eximia E. Horak & Desjardin

F
Psilocybe fagicola
Psilocybe fagicola var. fagicola
Psilocybe fagicola var. mesocystidiata Guzmán
Psilocybe farinacea Rick ex Guzmán
Psilocybe fimetaria (P.D. Orton) Watling
Psilocybe fuliginosa (Murrill) A.H. Sm.
Psilocybe furtadoana Guzmán

G

Psilocybe galindoi Guzmán 
Psilocybe gallaeciae Guzmán & M.L. Castro
Psilocybe graveolens Peck
Psilocybe guatapensis Guzmán, Saldarriaga, Pineda, García & Velázquez
Psilocybe guilartensis Guzmán, Tapia & Nieves-Rivera

H 
Psilocybe heimii Guzmán
Psilocybe herrerae Guzmán
Psilocybe hispanica Guzmán
Psilocybe hoogshagenii
Psilocybe hoogshagenii var. hoogshagenii "(= Psilocybe caerulipes var. gastonii Singer, Psilocybe zapotecorum R. Heim s. Singer)"
Psilocybe hoogshagenii var. convexa Guzmán (= Psilocybe semperviva R. Heim & Cailleux)
Psilocybe hopii Guzmán & J. Greene

I 
Psilocybe inconspicua Guzmán & Horak
Psilocybe indica Sathe & J.T. Daniel
Psilocybe isabelae Guzmán

J 
Psilocybe jacobsii Guzmán
Psilocybe jaliscana Guzmán

K 
Psilocybe kumaenorum R. Heim

L 
Psilocybe laurae Guzmán
Psilocybe lazoi Singer
Psilocybe liniformans
Psilocybe liniformans var. liniformans
Psilocybe liniformans var. americana Guzmán & Stamets

M 

Psilocybe mairei Singer
Psilocybe makarorae Johnst. & Buchanan
Psilocybe mammillata (Murrill) A.H. Sm.
Psilocybe medullosa (Bres.) Borovička
Psilocybe meridensis Guzmán
Psilocybe meridionalis Guzmán, Ram.-Guill. & Guzm.-Dáv.
Psilocybe mescaleroensis Guzmán, Walstad, E. Gándara & Ram.-Guill.
Psilocybe mexicana R. Heim
Psilocybe moseri Guzmán
Psilocybe muliercula Singer & A.H. Sm. (= Psilocybe wassonii R. Heim)

N 
Psilocybe naematoliformis Guzmán
Psilocybe natalensis Gartz, Reid, Smith & Eicker
Psilocybe natarajanii Guzmán (= Psilocybe aztecorum var. bonetii (Guzmán) Guzmán s. Natarajan & Raman)
Psilocybe neorhombispora Guzmán & Horak
Psilocybe neoxalapensis Guzmán, Ram.-Guill. & Halling

O 

Psilocybe ovoideocystidiata Guzmán et Gaines

P 
Psilocybe papuana Guzmán & Horak
Psilocybe paulensis (Guzmán & Bononi) Guzmán (= Psilocybe banderiliensis var. paulensis Guzmán & Bononi)
Psilocybe pelliculosa (A.H. Sm.) Singer & A.H. Sm.
Psilocybe pintonii Guzmán
Psilocybe pleurocystidiosa Guzmán
Psilocybe plutonia (Berk. & M.A. Curtis) Sacc.
Psilocybe portoricensis Guzmán, Tapia & Nieves-Rivera
Psilocybe pseudoaztecorum Natarajan & Raman
Psilocybe puberula Bas & Noordel.

Q 
Psilocybe quebecensis Ola'h & R. Heim

R 
Psilocybe rickii Guzmán & Cortez
Psilocybe rostrata (Petch) Pegler
Psilocybe rzedowskii Guzmán

S 

Psilocybe samuiensis Guzmán, Bandala & Allen
Psilocybe schultesii Guzmán & S.H. Pollock
Psilocybe semilanceata (Fr. : Secr.) P. Kumm.
Psilocybe septentrionalis (Guzmán) Guzmán (= Psilocybe subaeriginascens Höhn. var. septentrionalis Guzmán)
Psilocybe serbica Moser & Horak (non ss. Krieglsteiner)
Psilocybe sierrae Singer (= Psilocybe subfimetaria Guzmán & A.H. Sm.)
Psilocybe silvatica (Peck) Singer & A.H. Sm.
Psilocybe singeri Guzmán
Psilocybe strictipes Singer & A.H. Sm.
Psilocybe stuntzii Guzman & Ott
Psilocybe subacutipilea Guzmán, Saldarriaga, Pineda, García & Velázquez
Psilocybe subaeruginascens Hohnel
Psilocybe subaeruginosa Cleland
Psilocybe subbrunneocystidiata P.S. Silva & Guzmán
Psilocybe subcaerulipes Hongo
Psilocybe subcubensis Guzmán
Psilocybe subpsilocybioides Guzmán, Lodge & S.A. Cantrell
Psilocybe subtropicalis Guzmán

T 

Psilocybe tampanensis Guzmán & S.H. Pollock (photo)
Psilocybe tasmaniana Guzmán & Watling (1978)
Psilocybe thaiaerugineomaculans Guzmán, Karunarathna & Ram.-Guill.
Psilocybe thaicordispora Guzmán, Ram.-Guill. & Karun.
Psilocybe thaiduplicatocystidiata Guzmán, Karun. & Ram.-Guill.

U 
Psilocybe uruguayensis Singer ex Guzmán
Psilocybe uxpanapensis Guzmán

V 
Psilocybe venenata (S. Imai) Imaz. & Hongo (= Psilocybe fasciata Hongo; Stropharia caerulescens S. Imai)

W 

Psilocybe wassoniorum Guzmán & S.H. Pollock
Psilocybe weilii Guzmán, Tapia & Stamets (photo)
Psilocybe weldenii Guzmán
Psilocybe weraroa Borovicka, Oborník & Noordel.

X 
Psilocybe xalapensis Guzmán & A. López

Y 
Psilocybe yungensis Singer & A.H. Sm.

Z 

Psilocybe zapotecoantillarum Guzmán, T.J. Baroni & Lodge
Psilocybe zapotecocaribaea Guzmán, Ram.-Guill. & T.J. Baroni
Psilocybe zapotecorum

References

Entheogens
Psilocybin species
Psychoactive fungi
Psychedelic tryptamine carriers
Hallucinations